Nitrifying bacteria are chemolithotrophic organisms that include species of genera such as Nitrosomonas, Nitrosococcus, Nitrobacter, Nitrospina, Nitrospira and Nitrococcus. These bacteria get their energy from the oxidation of inorganic nitrogen compounds. Types include ammonia-oxidizing bacteria (AOB) and nitrite-oxidizing bacteria (NOB). Many species of nitrifying bacteria have complex internal membrane systems that are the location for key enzymes in nitrification: ammonia monooxygenase (which oxidizes ammonia to hydroxylamine), hydroxylamine oxidoreductase (which oxidizes hydroxylamine to nitric oxide - which is further oxidized to nitrite by a currently unidentified enzyme), and nitrite oxidoreductase (which oxidizes nitrite to nitrate).

Ecology
Nitrifying bacteria are present in distinct taxonomical groups and are found in highest numbers where considerable amounts of ammonia are present (such as areas with extensive protein decomposition, and sewage treatment plants).  Nitrifying bacteria thrive in lakes, streams, and rivers with high inputs and outputs of sewage, wastewater and freshwater because of the high ammonia content.

Oxidation of ammonia to nitrate
Nitrification in nature is a two-step oxidation process of ammonium or ammonia to nitrite and then to nitrate catalyzed by two ubiquitous bacterial groups growing together. The first reaction is oxidation of ammonium to nitrite by ammonia oxidizing bacteria (AOB) represented by members of Betaproteobacteria and Gammaproteobacteria. Further organisms able to oxidize ammonia are Archaea (AOA).

The second reaction is oxidation of nitrite to nitrate by nitrite-oxidizing bacteria (NOB), represented by the members of Nitrospinota, Nitrospirota, Pseudomonadota, and Chloroflexota.

This two-step process was described already in 1890 by the Ukrainian microbiologist Sergei Winogradsky.

Ammonia can be also oxidized completely to nitrate by one comammox bacterium.

First step nitrification - molecular mechanism 

Ammonia oxidation in autotrophic nitrification is a complex process that requires several enzymes as well as oxygen as a reactant. The key enzymes necessary for releasing energy during oxidation of ammonia to nitrite are ammonia monooxygenase (AMO) and hydroxylamine oxidoreductase (HAO). The first is a transmembrane copper protein which catalyzes the oxidation of ammonia to hydroxylamine (1.1) taking two electrons directly from the quinone pool. This reaction requires O2.

The second step of this process has recently fallen into question. For the past few decades, the common view was that a trimeric multiheme c-type HAO converts hydroxylamine into nitrite in the periplasm with production of four electrons (1.2). The stream of four electrons is channeled through cytochrome c554 to a membrane-bound cytochrome c552. Two of the electrons are routed back to AMO, where they are used for the oxidation of ammonia (quinol pool). The remaining two electrons are used to generate a proton motive force and reduce NAD(P) through reverse electron transport.

Recent results, however, show that HAO does not produce nitrite as a direct product of catalysis. This enzyme instead produces nitric oxide and three electrons. Nitric oxide can then be oxidized by other enzymes (or oxygen) to nitrite. In this paradigm, the electron balance for overall metabolism needs to be reconsidered.

 (1)
 (1.1)
 (1.2)

Second step nitrification - molecular mechanism 

Nitrite produced in the first step of autotrophic nitrification is oxidized to nitrate by nitrite oxidoreductase (NXR)(2). It is a membrane-associated iron-sulfur molybdo protein and is part of an electron transfer chain which channels electrons from nitrite to molecular oxygen. The enzymatic mechanisms involved in nitrite-oxidizing bacteria are less described than that of ammonium oxidation. Recent research (e.g. Woźnica A. et al., 2013) proposes a new hypothetical model of NOB electron transport chain and NXR mechanisms. Here, in contrast to earlier models, the NXR would act on the outside of the plasma membrane and directly contribute to a mechanism of proton gradient generation as postulated by Spieck  and coworkers. Nevertheless, the molecular mechanism of nitrite oxidation is an open question. 

 (2)

Comammox bacteria

Characteristics of nitrifying bacteria

Nitrifying bacteria that oxidize ammonia

Nitrifying bacteria that oxidize nitrite

Comammox bacteria

See also 
 Root nodule
 Denitrification
 Denitrifying bacteria
 f-ratio
 Nitrification
 Nitrogen cycle
 Nitrogen deficiency
 Nitrogen fixation
 Electron transport chain
Comammox

References

Bacteriology
Nitrogen cycle
Metabolism
Soil biology